The H. Allen Jerkens Stakes at Gulfstream Park is a Thoroughbred horse race open to three year olds and up run at a distance of two miles on turf. The race is named in honor of the late U. S. Racing Hall of Fame trainer H. Allen Jerkens.

The first running of the H. Allen Jerkens was held on January 31, 2015, with Unitarian winning the race. Jerkens himself presented the trophy for the race, which was run two months before his death on March 18, 2015.

Following its second running in January 2016, the H. Allen Jerkens Stakes was moved to December on the Gulfstream Park racing calendar. As a result, there were two runnings of the race in 2016.

Records
Speed record:
3:19.48 – Sir Anthony (2020)

Most wins by a jockey:
 2 – Tyler Gaffalione (2016, 2017)
 2 – José Ortiz (2019, 2022)
 2 – Luis Saez (2018, 2021)

Most wins by a trainer:
 4 – Todd Pletcher (2015, 2016, 2019, 2021)

Most wins by an owner:
 3 – Michael M. Hui (2016, 2020, 2022)

Winners 
Gulfstream Park Media Guide:

Notes:
 In 2016 there were two separate runnings of the race, in January and December.
 The 2019 race was run at 1 1/4 miles on the main track.
 The 2022 race was run at 1 5/8 miles on the all-weather track.

References

Ungraded stakes races in the United States
Horse races in Florida
Turf races in the United States
Gulfstream Park
Open long distance horse races
Recurring sporting events established in 2015
2015 establishments in Florida